Blair Athol is a former town within Clermont in the Isaac Region, Queensland, Australia. It was obliterated by the development of the Blair Athol coal mine.

History
Early settler James MacLaren took up a pastoral run in the area in 1863 and named it Blair Athol after the village Blair Atholl, the location of Blair Castle of the Duke of Atholl in Scotland. While sinking a well in 1864, he discovered coal on the property.

By 1873, early shafts were dug, revealing extensive seams of coal. At that time, around 100 people were living in the town and there was a hotel, although no township had been officially surveyed. The town was surveyed in 1878.

Blair Athol Provisional School opened on 6 November 1893. It became a State School in 1909.
 
Blair Athol Post Office opened on 1 July 1927 (a receiving office had been open from 1910) and closed in 1966.

On 18 May 1922, the Queensland Governor Matthew Nathan officially opened Australia's first open cut mine at Blair Athol.

By the 1970s, it became apparent that there were significant coal seams under the town. In order to construct an open cut mine, the town had to be sacrificed.

The school closed on 31 December 1974.

In 1981 a reunion was held at the community hall to mark the final end of the town, following which all of the town was demolished. Only the cemetery remains.

References

Further reading

External links

 

Towns in Queensland
Isaac Region
Clermont, Queensland